Újezd is a municipality and village in Beroun District in the Central Bohemian Region of the Czech Republic. It has about 700 inhabitants.

History
The first written mention of Újezd is from 1399.

Gallery

References

Villages in the Beroun District